Giovanni Clunie (born 20 December 1994), is a Costa Rican professional footballer who plays as a forward for Zweigen Kanazawa.

References

External links

1994 births
Living people
Costa Rican footballers
Association football forwards
C.S. Cartaginés players
Zweigen Kanazawa players
Liga FPD players
J2 League players